Nick Creek is a  long 2nd order tributary to the Rocky River in Chatham County, North Carolina.

Course
Nick Creek rises in a pond about 2 miles southeast of Crutchfield Crossroads, North Carolina in Chatham County and then flows southwest to join the Rocky River about 2.5 miles northeast of Siler City.

Watershed
Nick Creek drains  of area, receives about 47.9 in/year of precipitation, has a wetness index of 440.45 and is about 45% forested.

References

Rivers of North Carolina
Rivers of Chatham County, North Carolina